DVR can refer to:
 Dalnevostochnaya Respublika, a nominally independent state that existed from April 1920 to November 1922 in the easternmost part of the Russian Far East
 Data validation and reconciliation 
 Derwent Valley Railway (disambiguation)
 Devco Railway
 Differential Voting Right, a kind of equity share
 Digital video recorder
 Discrete valuation ring
 Discrete variable representation
 Distance-vector routing
 Direct volume rendering
 Dynamic voltage restoration
 DVR College of Engineering and Technology
 Van Riebeeck Decoration (DVR), a South African military award